The Pietermaritzburg Italian P.O.W. Church is a provincial heritage site in Pietermaritzburg in the KwaZulu-Natal province of South Africa.

In 1977 it was described in the Government Gazette as

See also 
 Italian Chapel
 Prisoner of war
 Italian South Africans

References

External links
 
 Heritage KZN entry (2012)
 Photograph
 Detailed photographs showing names on memorial plaques (Genealogical Society of South Africa)

Roman Catholic churches in South Africa
Churches in Pietermaritzburg
Italian-South African culture
Italian prisoners of war